The Gundabooka National Park is a protected national park in the north-west region of New South Wales, in eastern Australia.

The national park is located adjacent to both the Darling River and the Toorale National Park, both located on the northwest boundary of the national park. Mount Gunderbooka and the Gunderbooka Range is located within the park. Prior to becoming a park the area was home to the Ngemba and a sheep station. Petroglyph rock art and ancestral ceremonial grounds are located inside the park. It has many exotic plants.

Large open plains, ends of grassy forests and rusty rocky cliffs dominate the landscape.

See also

 Protected areas of New South Wales

References

External links
 

National parks of New South Wales
1996 establishments in Australia
North West Slopes